The 1931 Maryland Aggies football team was an American football team that represented the University of Maryland in the 1931 Southern Conference football season. In their 21st season under head coach Curley Byrd, the Aggies compiled an 8–1–1 record (4–1–1 in conference), finished fifth in the Southern Conference, and outscored their opponents by a total of 194 to 98.

Schedule

References

Maryland
Maryland Terrapins football seasons
Maryland Aggies football